, born in 1960, is an avant-garde, expatriate American poet and essayist who resides in Japan. She is the author of volumes of poetry, poetry chapbooks, and a poetry broadside. Her poems have appeared in print and online journals and anthologies published in Japan, the United States, United Kingdom, Canada, Australia and a number of other countries. Her work is archived in the University of Chicago library's special collection of poetry from Japan.

Her work has been linked to ecopoetics, feminism., and she has a long-standing interest in disability poetics.

Biography

Jane Joritz was born in Harvey, Illinois in 1960. She received a Bachelor of Arts in Creative Writing (poetry specialization) from Columbia College (Chicago) and completed her Masters of Arts degree in linguistics at the University of Illinois at Chicago. In 1989, she moved to Japan, and in 1990, married Japanese urologist Junichirō Nakagawa.

She worked as associate professor at a national teacher training university, Aichi University of Education, until the spring of 2012, where she taught courses in American and British poetry, comparative poetry, gender studies, American history and pedagogy. Currently she is a freelance writer and educator living in Shizuoka Prefecture and Nagano Prefecture.

A vegan and an advocate of women's and animal rights, she has stated "Activism runs through what I read and what I write and what I'm teaching." Her tenth full-length collection, Plan B Audio, which includes photography by Susan Laura Sullivan, addresses cancer, the female body and other subjects; her treatment of these issues is discussed in reviews of this work in Tears in the Fence, The Long Poem Magazine, and Wordgathering.

Major publications
Poetry collections, chapbooks, and broadsides
 Skin Museum, Avant Books, Tokyo, 2006. .
 Aquiline, Printed Matter Press, Tokyo, 2007. .
 EXHIBIT C, Ahadada Books, Toronto/Tokyo, 2008. .
 The Meditations, Otoliths, Rockhampton, Australia, 2009. .
 incidental music, BlazeVOX Books, Buffalo, NY, 2010. .
 notational, Otoliths, Rockhampton, Australia, 2011. 
 blank notes (poetry broadside), Country Valley Press, USA, 2012.
 flux of measure (poetry chapbook), quarter after press, USA, 2012.
 season of flux (poetry chapbook), quarter after press, USA, 2013.
 Invisible City White Sky Ebooks, USA, 2012.
 FLUX BlazeVOX, Buffalo, NY, 2013. 
 wildblacklake (poetry chapbook) Hank's Original Loose Gravel Press, Palmyra, NY, 2014.
 "Distant Landscapes", theenk Books, Palmyra, NY, 2015. 
 "diurnal" (poetry chapbook), Grey Book Press, USA, 2016.
 "terra form(a)" (poetry ebook), The Argotist Online, UK, 2017
 "women poetry migration: an anthology" theenk Books, Palmyra, NY, 2017 
 "Poems: New & Selected" Isobar Press, Tokyo, 2018, 
 "Plan B Audio" Isobar Press, Tokyo, 2020,

References

1960 births
Living people
Columbia College Chicago alumni
University of Illinois Chicago alumni
People from Harvey, Illinois
American women poets
American emigrants to Japan
21st-century American poets
21st-century American women writers